Arman Adikyan (born 10 November 1984) is an Armenian Greco-Roman wrestler.

He competed at the 2008 Summer Olympics in the men's Greco-Roman 66 kg division.

Adikyan was a member of the Armenian Greco-Roman wrestling team at the 2010 Wrestling World Cup. The Armenian team came in third place. Adikyan personally won a silver medal.

References

External links
Sports-Reference.com

1984 births
Living people
People from Vagharshapat
Armenian male sport wrestlers
Olympic wrestlers of Armenia
Wrestlers at the 2008 Summer Olympics
21st-century Armenian people